Teng Weizao (1917–2008), was a Chinese economist and educator. He served as President of Nankai University, and the Chairman of China and United States Economic Association. Teng was a pioneer of Chinese modern economics study, especially in the fields of multinational corporation and Japanese economy.

Life
Teng was born in Funing County, Jiangsu Province in January 1917. He graduated from the Department of Agriculture Economics, Zhejiang University in 1942. He did his postgraduate study at the National Southwestern Associated University during the Second Sino-Japanese War.

1946, Teng was pointed as a teacher of Nankai University. 1950-1953, he served as the dean of the School of Economics, Nankai University. From October 1981 to January 1986, He was the President of Nankai University.

When Teng died in 2008, many prominent Chinese politicians came to his funeral.

Academic Positions
 Chairman, China and United States Economic Association
 Vice-chairman, Chinese World Economy Association

Work
 Transnational Corporations and China's Open Door Policy

References

External links
 Obituary for Teng Weizao (Sina.com) 

People's Republic of China economists
Zhejiang University alumni
1917 births
2008 deaths
Educators from Yancheng
Academic staff of Nankai University
Presidents of Nankai University
Writers from Yancheng
Economists from Jiangsu
People of the Republic of China